Georgi Tsvetkov (Bulgarian: Георги Цветков; born 10 September 1947) is a former Bulgarian footballer who played as a forward. He competed at the 1968 Summer Olympics in Mexico City, where he won a silver medal with the Bulgarian team.

Honours

Club
Levski Sofia
 A Group (2): 1973–74, 1976–77
 Bulgarian Cup (3): 1971, 1976, 1977

References

External links
Player Profile at LevskiSofia.info
Profile at National-Football-Teams

1947 births
Living people
Bulgarian footballers
Bulgaria international footballers
First Professional Football League (Bulgaria) players
Akademik Sofia players
PFC Levski Sofia players
PFC Spartak Varna players
Olympic footballers of Bulgaria
Footballers at the 1968 Summer Olympics
Olympic silver medalists for Bulgaria
Olympic medalists in football
Medalists at the 1968 Summer Olympics
Bulgarian football managers
Footballers from Sofia
Association football forwards